McCaul Lombardi (born May 20, 1991) is an American actor. Born in Baltimore City, Maryland, he is known for his roles in American Honey, which won the Jury Prize at the 2016 Cannes Film Festival; and Patti Cake$ - which had its world premiere at the 2017 Sundance Film Festival, was acquired by Fox Searchlight, and was the closing night film during Directors' Fortnight at the 2017 Cannes Film Festival.

Career
Lombardi moved to Los Angeles to pursue becoming an actor. Lombardi made his film debut in American Honey, about a magazine crew traveling across the country, written and directed by Andrea Arnold. The film had its world premiere at the 2016 Cannes Film Festival and was distributed domestically by A24.  Lombardi has two films awaiting release, including: Killing Animals opposite Joey King; and We, the Coyotes, which premiered at ACID (Association for Independent Cinema and its Distribution) during the 2018 Cannes Film Festival. Lombardi's latest release Sollers Point, directed by Matt Porterfield, was released in North America from 11 May 2018, selected as The New York Times' "Critic's Pick", and ThePlaylist.net wrote that Lombardi "convey[ed] that complexity in a thrillingly physical and non-theatrical performance" and rated the film A−.

In early 2017, Lombardi appeared in a major worldwide advertising campaign for Ermenegildo Zegna with Robert De Niro; and in 2016, Lombardi appeared in a campaign for eyewear brand Oliver Peoples.

Filmography

Film

References

External links
 

21st-century American male actors
American male film actors
Male actors from Baltimore
Living people
1991 births